Karakax County, alternatively Moyu County, also transliterated from Uyghur as Qaraqash County, alternately Qaraqash, is a county in the Xinjiang Uyghur Autonomous Region and is located in the southern edge of the Tarim Basin, it is under the administration of the Hotan Prefecture. According to the 2011 census it has a population of 577,000 and 98,1% are Uyghurs. The county is bordered to the north by Awat County in Aksu Prefecture, to the northeast by Lop County, to the southeast by Hotan County, to the northwest by Maralbexi County in Kashgar Prefecture, and to the southwest by Pishan County and Kunyu. Exclaves of Kunyu are located within the county.

History
In the Late Qing dynasty, the area that would become Karakax County was divided into four ming (Mandarin Chinese Hanyu Pinyin-derived names): Hayashi, Buhua, Makuiya, and Kuiya. On the eve of the creation of the county, the area was divided into six ming: Zhawa, Ying'ai (also known as Tahe), Balamusu, Kuiya, Makuiya, and Ka'ersai.

In 1919, the county was split off from Hotan County.

In October 1984, the people's communes in the county were replaced with towns and townships.

In 2012, Zawa (Zhawa) was changed from a township into a town.

In 2013, Kuya (Kuiya) was changed from a township into a town.

On February 13, 2014, Qarasaz (Ka'ersai) was changed from a township into a town.

On the morning of June 20, 2014, five police officers at a security checkpoint in Kayash village in Manglay township were found dead killed by unknown assailants. The security checkpoint, known as a place where women wearing headscarves and men wearing beards would be interrogated, was razed to the ground.

At 3 AM on July 19, 2014, the day after a raid at a local mosque, Zeynep Memtimin, wife of party secretary Rejep Islam, was killed by unknown assailants in an attack at their home. Islam was severely injured and left for dead, but survived.

In December 2016, the Communist Party office in Karakax County was reportedly attacked by assailants using knives and improvised explosive devices, leading to the deaths of two government employees and three assailants.

In 2017, the county was divided between four and later five main district area committees.

In February 2020 dissidents leaked the hacked records of 311 detained Uyghurs from a single neighborhood in Karakax County.

Geography 

The populated part of Karakax county is located at the northern edge of the Karakoram mountains and southern part of Tarim basin (Taklamakan Desert). The Karakax river separates the county from Hotan County and the Hotan River separates the county from Lop County. Mazartag is a prominent arc-shaped mountain range in the northern desert area of the county.

Climate

Administrative divisions 
Karakax county is subdivided into the following five towns, 11 townships and two other areas, in total 18 township-level divisions (referred to in Uyghur as bazar and yéza):

Towns:
 Karakax (Kalakashi;  / ), Zawa (Zhawa, Cha-wa;  / ), Kuya (Kuiya;  / ), Qarasay (Ka'ersai;  / ), Purchaqchi (Puqiakeqi;  / , formerly  / )

Townships:
 Aqsaray (Akesalayi;  / ), Urchi (Wu'erqi;  / ), Tokhula (Tuohula, Tuxula; / ), Saybagh (Sayibage, Saywagh;  / ), Jahanbagh (Jiahan Bage;  / ), Manglay (Manglai;  / ), Qochi (Kuoyiqi;  / ), Yawa (Ya-wa;  / ), Tüwat (Tuwaite, Tüwet;  /  ), Yéngiyer (Yingye'er;  / ), Kawak (Kawake;  / )

Other areas:
Regiment 417, Regiment 224

Economy
The county produces cotton, corn, wheat, melons, silkworm cocoons, black jade and walnuts. Industries include cotton ginning, food processing, tractors and carpet making.

Demographics

As of 2015, Uyghurs made up 97.61% of the population of the county. Han Chinese made up 2.34%  of the population.

As of 1999, 98.53% of the population of Karakax (Moyu) County was Uyghur and 1.44% of the population was Han Chinese.

Transportation
Karakax county has daily bus and taxi to Hotan and other counties like Guma, and also has direct luxury buses to Ürümchi, which is the capital city of Xinjiang, Karakax is also served by China National Highway 315 and the Kashgar-Hotan Railway.

A long, straight special-use road enters the Taklamakan Desert northwest of Dunkule village in Kawak (Kawake) township. The road turns near a ridge and terminates near buildings. The area is near Mazar Tagh (Ma-cha-t’a-ko, Mazartag;  / ).

See also
 Melikawat

Notes

References 

County-level divisions of Xinjiang
Hotan Prefecture